Hoplitoides is an ammonite from the Upper Cretaceous, Turonian belonging to the Coilopoceratidae, a family in the Acanthoceratoidea.  Hoplitoides have early whorls which are grooved, then flat, and finally narrowly rounded venters; early stages with umbilical tubercles and space ribs, later stages becoming smooth. The suture is similar to that of Coilopoceras but less extreme. Hoplitoides has an established distribution which is widespread, from western North America, northwestern Africa and northern South America.

Species 

 H. gibbulosus 
 H. ingens
 H. koeneni
 H. latesellatus (type species)
 H. mirabilis
 H. sandovalensis
 H. wohltmanni

Distribution 
Fossils of Hoplitoides have been found in Brazil, Cameroon, Colombia (La Frontera, Huila, Cundinamarca and Boyacá, Loma Gorda, Aipe, Huila and San Rafael Formations), Mexico, Nigeria, Peru, Trinidad and Tobago, Tunisia, United States (New Mexico), and Venezuela.

References

Bibliography

Further reading

External links 
 The Paleobiology Database - Hoplitoides entry accessed 2 December 2011

Ammonitida genera
Acanthoceratoidea
Cretaceous ammonites
Ammonites of Africa
Cretaceous Africa
Ammonites of North America
Cretaceous Mexico
Cretaceous United States
Ammonites of South America
Cretaceous Brazil
Cretaceous Caribbean
Cretaceous Colombia
Cretaceous Peru
Cretaceous Venezuela
Turonian genus first appearances
Coniacian genus extinctions
Turonian life
Coniacian life
Fossil taxa described in 1898